Hayden Mountain may refer to the following peaks or locations in the United States. These features are generally named after Ferdinand Hayden, an American geologist noted for his pioneering surveying expeditions of the Rocky Mountains in the late 19th century.

Peaks
Hayden Mountain (Alabama)
Hayden Mountain (Colorado)
Hayden Mountain (New York)
Hayden Mountain (Oregon)
Hayden Mountain (Texas)
Hayden Peak (San Miguel County, Colorado)
Hayden Peak (Utah)

Other
Hayden Mountain Summit, in Klamath County, Oregon
Hayden Mountain Airport, in Washington County, Oregon